William Thomas Strayhorn (November 29, 1915 – May 31, 1967) was an American jazz composer, pianist, lyricist, and arranger, who collaborated with bandleader and composer Duke Ellington for nearly three decades. His compositions include "Take the 'A' Train", "Chelsea Bridge", "A Flower Is a Lovesome Thing", and "Lush Life".

Early life
Strayhorn was born in Dayton, Ohio, United States. His family soon moved to the Homewood section of Pittsburgh, Pennsylvania. However, his mother's family came from Hillsborough, North Carolina, and she sent him there to protect him from his father's drunken sprees. Strayhorn spent many months of his childhood at his grandparents' house in Hillsborough. In an interview, Strayhorn said that his grandmother was his primary influence during the first ten years of his life. He became interested in music while living with her, playing hymns on her piano, and playing records on her Victrola record player.

Return to Pittsburgh and meeting Ellington
Strayhorn returned to Pittsburgh while still in grade school. He worked odd jobs to earn enough money to buy his first piano, and took lessons from Charlotte Enty Catlin. He attended Westinghouse High School, later attended by Erroll Garner and Ahmad Jamal. He played in the school band, and studied under Carl McVicker, who had also instructed jazz pianists Erroll Garner and Mary Lou Williams. In Pittsburgh, he studied classical music for a time at the Pittsburgh Music Institute, writing a high school musical, forming a musical trio that played daily on a local radio station, and, while still in his teens, composing (with lyrics) the songs "Life Is Lonely" (later renamed "Lush Life"), "My Little Brown Book", and "Something to Live For". By age 19, he was writing for a professional musical, Fantastic Rhythm.

Though classical music was Strayhorn's first love, his ambition to become a classical composer was foiled by the harsh reality of a black man trying to make it in the classical world, which at that time was almost completely white. Strayhorn was then introduced to the music of pianists like Art Tatum and Teddy Wilson at age 19. The artistic influence of these musicians guided him into the realm of jazz where he remained for the rest of his life. His first jazz exposure was in a combo called the Mad Hatters that played around Pittsburgh. Strayhorn's fellow students, guitarist Bill Esch and drummer Mickey Scrima, also influenced his transition to jazz, and he began writing arrangements for Buddy Malone's Pittsburgh dance band after 1937.
 
After seeing Duke Ellington play in Pittsburgh in 1933, Strayhorn met him in December 1938 after an Ellington performance there. He first explained, and then showed the band leader how he would have arranged one of Duke's own pieces. Ellington was impressed enough to invite other band members to hear Strayhorn. At the end of the visit, he arranged for Strayhorn to meet him when the band returned to New York. Strayhorn worked for Ellington for the next quarter century as an arranger, composer, occasional pianist and collaborator until his early death from cancer. As Ellington described him, "Billy Strayhorn was my right arm, my left arm, all the eyes in the back of my head, my brain waves in his head, and his in mine."

Working with Ellington

Strayhorn's relationship with Ellington was always difficult to pin down: Strayhorn was a gifted composer and arranger who seemed to flourish in Duke's shadow. Ellington was arguably a father figure and the band was affectionately protective of the diminutive, mild-mannered, unselfish Strayhorn, nicknamed by the band "Strays", "Weely", and "Swee' Pea". Ellington may have taken advantage of him, but not in the mercenary way in which others had taken advantage of Ellington; instead, he used Strayhorn to complete his thoughts and introduce new musical ideas, while giving him the freedom to write on his own and enjoy at least some of the credit he deserved. Though Duke Ellington took credit for much of Strayhorn's work, he did not maliciously drown out his partner. Ellington would make jokes onstage like, "Strayhorn does a lot of the work but I get to take the bows!" On the other hand, Ellington did not oppose his publicists' frequently crediting him without any mention of Strayhorn, and, despite the latter's attempts to hide his dissatisfaction, "Strayhorn revealed", at least to his friends, "a deepening well of unease about his lack of public recognition as Ellington's prominence grew."

Strayhorn composed the band's best known theme, "Take the 'A' Train", and a number of other pieces that became part of the band's repertoire. In some cases Strayhorn received attribution for his work such as "Lotus Blossom", "Chelsea Bridge", and "Rain Check", while others, such as "Day Dream" and "Something to Live For", were listed as collaborations with Ellington or, in the case of "Satin Doll" and "Sugar Hill Penthouse", were credited to Ellington alone. Strayhorn also arranged many of Ellington's band-within-band recordings and provided harmonic clarity, taste, and polish to Duke's compositions. On the other hand, Ellington gave Strayhorn full credit as his collaborator on later, larger works such as Such Sweet Thunder, A Drum Is a Woman, The Perfume Suite and The Far East Suite, where Strayhorn and Ellington worked closely together. Strayhorn also often sat in on the piano with the Ellington Orchestra, both live and in the studio.

Detroit Free Press music critic Mark Stryker concludes that the work of Strayhorn and Ellington in the score of the 1959 Hollywood film Anatomy of a Murder is "indispensable, [although] ... too sketchy to rank in the top echelon among Ellington-Strayhorn masterpiece suites like Such Sweet Thunder and The Far East Suite, but its most inspired moments are their equal."  Film historians have recognized the soundtrack "as a landmark—the first significant Hollywood film music by African Americans comprising non-diegetic music, that is, music whose source is not visible or implied by action in the film, like an on-screen band."  The score "avoided the cultural stereotypes that previously characterized jazz scores and rejected a strict adherence to visuals in ways that presaged the New Wave cinema of the ’60s."

In 1960, the two collaborated on the album The Nutcracker Suite, recorded for the Columbia label and featuring jazz interpretations of "The Nutcracker" by Tchaikovsky, arranged by the two. The original album cover is notable for the inclusion of Strayhorn's name and picture along with Ellington's on the front.

Personal life
Shortly before going on his second European tour with his orchestra, from March to May 1939, Ellington announced to his sister Ruth and son Mercer Ellington that Strayhorn "is staying with us." Through Mercer, Strayhorn met his first partner, African American musician Aaron Bridgers, with whom Strayhorn lived until Bridgers moved to Paris in 1947.

Strayhorn was openly gay. He participated in many civil rights causes. As a committed friend to Martin Luther King Jr., he arranged and conducted "King Fit the Battle of Alabama'" for the Ellington Orchestra in 1963 for the historical revue (and album) My People, dedicated to King.

Strayhorn's strong character left an impression on many people who met him. He had a major influence on the career of Lena Horne, who wanted to marry Strayhorn and considered him to have been the love of her life. Strayhorn used his classical background to improve Horne's singing technique. They eventually recorded songs together. In the 1950s, Strayhorn left his musical partner Duke Ellington for a few years to pursue a solo career of his own. He released a few solo albums and revues for the Copasetics (a New York show-business society), and took on theater productions with his friend Luther Henderson.

Illness and death
In 1964, Strayhorn was diagnosed with esophageal cancer, the disease that took his life in 1967. Strayhorn finally succumbed in the early morning on May 31, 1967, in the company of his partner, Bill Grove, not in Lena Horne's arms as has often been falsely reported. By her own account, she was touring in Europe when she received the news of Strayhorn's death. His ashes were scattered in the Hudson River by a gathering of his closest friends.

While in the hospital, he had submitted his final composition to Ellington. "Blood Count" was used as the third track to Ellington's memorial album for Strayhorn, …And His Mother Called Him Bill, which was recorded several months after Strayhorn's death. The last track of the album is a spontaneous solo version of "Lotus Blossom" performed by Ellington, who sat at the piano and played for his friend while the band (who can be heard in the background) were packing up after the formal end of the recording session.

Legacy
A Pennsylvania State Historical Marker highlighting Strayhorn's accomplishments was placed at Westinghouse High School in Pittsburgh, from which he graduated.  In North Carolina, a state historical marker honoring Strayhorn is located in downtown Hillsborough, near his "boyhood home". Strayhorn is also memorialized in a mural in Downtown Hillsborough. 

The former Regent Theatre in Pittsburgh's East Liberty neighborhood was renamed the Kelly Strayhorn Theater in honor of Strayhorn and fellow Pittsburgher Gene Kelly in 2000. It is a community-based performing arts theater.

In 2015, Strayhorn was inducted into the Legacy Walk.

In his autobiography and in a spoken word passage in his Second Sacred Concert, Duke Ellington listed what he considered Strayhorn's "four major moral freedoms": "freedom from hate, unconditionally; freedom from self-pity (even through all the pain and bad news); freedom from fear of possibly doing something that might possibly help another more than it might himself and freedom from the kind of pride that might make a man think that he was better than his brother or his neighbor."

Discography 
For albums where Strayhorn arranged or performed with the Duke Ellington Orchestra see Duke Ellington discography

As leader/co-leader 
 Billy Strayhorn !!!Live!!! (Roulette, 1958) – live
 Cue for Saxophone (Felsted, 1959) 
 The Peaceful Side (United Artists, 1963) – recorded in 1961
 Great Times! with Duke Ellington (Mercer, 1964) – recorded in 1950
 Lush Life (Red Baron, 1992)

As arranger 
 Johnny Hodges with Billy Strayhorn and the Orchestra (Verve, 1962) – recorded in 1961

As sideman 
With Johnny Hodges
 Castle Rock (Norgran, 1955) – recorded in 1951
 Creamy (Norgran, 1955)
 Ellingtonia '56 (Norgran, 1956)
 Duke's in Bed (Verve, 1956)
 The Big Sound (Verve, 1957)
 Blues-a-Plenty (Verve, 1958)
 Not So Dukish (Verve, 1958)

With Joya Sherrill
 Joya Sherrill Sings Duke (20th Century Fox, 1965)

With Ben Webster
 Music for Loving (Norgran, 1954)

See also 

 List of jazz musicians
 List of jazz standards

References

Sources

External links

 Richard S. Ginell, Billy Strayhorn Biography at AllMusic
 Billy Strayhorn: Lush Life at PBS, Independent Lens
 John Twomey, Billy Strayhorn: "Portrait Of A Silk Thread"
 Billy Strayhorn at the glbtq Encyclopaedia
 The Duke Ellington Society, TDES, Inc
 Billy Strayhorn Pittsburgh Music History
 Duke Ellington and Billy Strayhorn: Jazz Composers An online exhibition from the National Museum of American History, Smithsonian Institution
 
Billy Strayhorn music manuscripts and estate papers, 1918-2015 at the Library of Congress

1915 births
1967 deaths
20th-century American composers
20th-century American male musicians
20th-century American pianists
20th-century jazz composers
20th-century American LGBT people
African-American jazz composers
African-American jazz musicians
African-American jazz pianists
African-American male composers
African-American pianists
American gay musicians
American jazz composers
American male jazz composers
American male pianists
American music arrangers
American LGBT songwriters
Deaths from esophageal cancer
Duke Ellington Orchestra members
Jazz arrangers
Jazz musicians from New York (state)
Jazz musicians from North Carolina
Jazz musicians from Pennsylvania
LGBT African Americans
LGBT jazz composers
LGBT people from Ohio
Gay composers
Gay songwriters
Mainstream jazz pianists
Musicians from Dayton, Ohio
Musicians from New York City
Musicians from Pittsburgh
People from Hillsborough, North Carolina
Red Baron Records artists
Swing pianists